Nativity in Black: A Tribute to Black Sabbath are two Black Sabbath tribute albums, released in 1994 and 2000 respectively. The albums feature various heavy metal groups performing cover versions of Black Sabbath songs in tribute to the band.

Information
All of the tracks featured on the Nativity in Black albums cover material strictly from the band's 1970s heyday with vocalist Ozzy Osbourne. The title is derived from a widespread yet incorrect assumption surrounding the title of the Black Sabbath song "N.I.B.".

The band Bullring Brummies featured Black Sabbath founding members Geezer Butler and Bill Ward, along with vocalist Rob Halford, Obsessed/Saint Vitus guitarist Scott "Wino" Weinrich, and Fight guitarist Brian Tilse. Their cover of "The Wizard" on the first album is their only official recording, with the musicians coming together specifically for this recording.

The live recording of "War Pigs" by Faith No More was previously included on the band's live album, Live at the Brixton Academy.

1000 Homo DJs' version of "Supernaut" was originally released as a 12" single in 1990.

The album was certified Gold by the RIAA on 4 December 2000. Bob Chiappardi of Concrete Marketing was executive producer for the album. Megadeth's cover of "Paranoid" received a Grammy nomination in 1995 for 'Best Metal Performance'.

Nativity in Black

Nativity in Black II

References

External links
[ Nativity in Black] at AllMusic
[ Nativity in Black II] at AllMusic
Music video for "After Forever" by Biohazard

Black Sabbath tribute albums
1994 compilation albums
2000 compilation albums
Compilation album series
Priority Records compilation albums
Heavy metal compilation albums